The Atlantic Ocean is the second largest of the world's oceans, that separates the old world from the new world.

Atlantic may also refer to:

Places

In Canada
 Atlantic, Nova Scotia
 Atlantic Canada

In the United States
 Atlantic, Iowa
 Atlantic, Massachusetts
 Atlantic, North Carolina, an unincorporated community in eastern Carteret County
 Atlantic, Pennsylvania
 Atlantic, Seattle, a neighborhood in Washington state
 Atlantic, Virginia
 Atlantic City, New Jersey
 Atlantic County, New Jersey
 Atlantic Peak (Colorado), a mountain

Art, entertainment, and media

Companies and labels
 Atlantic Books, an independent British publishing house
 Atlantic Monthly Press, an American publishing house
 Atlantic Entertainment Group, a defunct movie studio company
 Atlantic FM, a former radio station serving Cornwall, United Kingdom
 Atlantic Records, a record company

Music
 The Atlantics, an Australian surf rock band formed in the early 1960s

Albums
 Atlantic (Dufresne album)
 Atlantic (Theatre album)

Songs
 "Atlantic" (song), by Keane
 "Atlantic", a song by Björk from Vessel (DVD)
 "Atlantic", a song by Thrice from Vheissu

Other art, entertainment, and media
 Atlantic (film), a 1929 black and white British film
The Atlantic, an American magazine founded as The Atlantic Monthly in 1857
 Atlantic (2015 film), an Irish documentary film, awarded Best Irish Documentary at the 2016 Dublin International Film Festival

Enterprises and organizations
 Atlantic (cinema), a movie theater in Warsaw, Poland
 Atlantic (toy company), a defunct Italian toy manufacturer
 Atlantic (supermarkets), a defunct supermarket chain in Greece
 Atlantic Broadband, a cable company in Massachusetts
Atlantic City Electric, a division of Elexon supplying electricity in New Jersey
 Atlantic LNG, a liquefied natural gas producing company based in Trinidad and Tobago
Atlantic Petroleum, a former oil company in the United States
 Atlantic Petroleum (Faroe Islands), an oil and gas production company
 Atlantic Philanthropies, a defunct private foundation
 Atlantic Superstore, a Canadian supermarket chain
 Atlantic Technological University, north-western Ireland 
 Atlantic University, Virginia Beach, Virginia
A&P (The Great Atlantic & Pacific Tea Company), a defunct American and Canadian supermarket chain
 Groupe Atlantic, a French climate control engineering company

Sports
 Atlantic Championship, developmental open-wheel racing series in North America
 Atlantic League of Professional Baseball, an American professional baseball league

Structures
 Atlantic Building or Edificio Atlantic, a condominium building in Havana, Cuba
 The Atlantic (Atlanta), a skyscraper in Atlanta, Georgia, United States

Transportation

Airlines
 Air Atlantic, a Canadian airline
 Atlantic Airways, a Faroese airline company

Aircraft
 Breguet Atlantic, a French long-range maritime patrol aircraft (1961)

Motor vehicles
 Atlantic (1921 automobile), a defunct automobile company
 Austin Atlantic, a British car produced by the Austin Motor Company from 1949 to 1952
 Fisker Atlantic, a 2012 plug-in electric concept car

Railroads and trains
 Atlantic (locomotive), name of an early steam-powered locomotive of the Baltimore and Ohio Railroad
 Atlantic station (Los Angeles Metro)
 Atlantic station (Staten Island Railway)
 Atlantic (train), a named passenger train operated by Canadian Pacific Railway and later Via Rail
 Atlantic, a type of steam locomotive with a 4-4-2 wheel arrangement (UIC classification 2B1)

Ships
 , any one of several vessels by that name
 Atlantic (yacht), a three-masted gaff-rigged schooner
 Atlantic 85-class lifeboats, lifeboats that serve the shores of the United Kingdom and Ireland as a part of the RNLI inshore fleet

Other uses
 Atlantic (period) of palaeoclimatology
 Atlantic languages (formerly West Atlantic), a language family in West Africa
 Atlantic (horse), British-bred Thoroughbred racehorse of the 1870s

See also

 
 Atlantik (disambiguation)
 Atlantique (disambiguation)
 Atlantic Beach (disambiguation)
 Atlantic Bridge (disambiguation)
 Atlantic City (disambiguation)